

Champions

Major League Baseball
World Series: Detroit Tigers over San Diego Padres (4–1); Alan Trammell, MVP

American League Championship Series MVP: Kirk Gibson
National League Championship Series MVP: Steve Garvey
All-Star Game, July 10 at Candlestick Park: National League, 3–1; Gary Carter, MVP

Other champions
Amateur World Series: Cuba
Caribbean World Series: Águilas del Zulia (Venezuela)
College World Series: Cal State-Fullerton
Japan Series: Hiroshima Toyo Carp over Hankyu Braves (4–3)
Korean Series: Lotte Giants over Samsung Lions
Big League World Series: Taipei, Taiwan
Junior League World Series: Pearl City, Hawaii
Little League World Series: Seoul National, Seoul, South Korea
Senior League World Series: Altamonte Springs, Florida
Summer Olympic Games at Los Angeles (demonstration sport): Japan (1st), United States (2nd), Chinese Taipei (3rd)

Awards and honors
Baseball Hall of Fame
Luis Aparicio
Don Drysdale
Rick Ferrell
Harmon Killebrew
Pee Wee Reese
Most Valuable Player
Willie Hernández, Detroit Tigers, P (AL)
Ryne Sandberg, Chicago Cubs, 2B (NL)
Cy Young Award
Willie Hernández, Detroit Tigers (AL)
Rick Sutcliffe, Chicago Cubs (NL)
Rookie of the Year
Alvin Davis, Seattle Mariners, 1B (AL)
Dwight Gooden, New York Mets, P (NL)
Manager of the Year Award
Sparky Anderson, Detroit Tigers (AL)
Jim Frey, Chicago Cubs (NL)
Woman Executive of the Year (major or minor league): Mildred Boyenga, Waterloo Indians, Midwest League
Gold Glove Award
Eddie Murray (1B) (AL) 
Lou Whitaker (2B) (AL) 
Buddy Bell (3B) (AL) 
Alan Trammell (SS) (AL) 
Dwight Evans (OF) (AL) 
Dave Winfield (OF) (AL) 
Dwayne Murphy (OF) (AL)
Lance Parrish (C) (AL) 
Ron Guidry (P) (AL)

MLB statistical leaders

Major league baseball final standings

Events

January
January 10 – Luis Aparicio, Don Drysdale and Harmon Killebrew are elected to the Hall of Fame by the Baseball Writers' Association of America.
January 20 – Believing that it is unnecessary to protect a 39-year-old pitcher, the New York Mets leave Tom Seaver unprotected, and he is chosen by the Chicago White Sox from the Mets as a free agent compensation pick.

February

March
March 8 – Shortstop Pee Wee Reese and catcher Rick Ferrell are elected to the Hall of Fame by the Special Veterans Committee. Reese hit .269 in 16 seasons with the Dodgers in Brooklyn and Los Angeles, while Ferrell batted .281 with 28 home runs in 18 seasons for the Browns, Red Sox and Senators.

April
April 7 :
Jack Morris of the Detroit Tigers no-hits the Chicago White Sox 4–0 at Comiskey Park, in a game televised on NBC.
The New York Mets' Dwight Gooden strikes out five in five innings to earn his first major league win, 3–2 over the Houston Astros.
April 13 – Twenty-one years to the day that he collects his first Major League hit, Pete Rose collects the 4,000th hit of his career; he is only the second player (after Ty Cobb) to ever do so.
April 22 – For the second day in a row, the Philadelphia Phillies put up twelve runs against the New York Mets, assuming first place in the National League East.
April 27 – After nineteen innings, two Glenn Abbott errors followed by a Kirk Gibson error in right field lead to four unearned runs for the Cleveland Indians, who beat Detroit 8–4 at Tiger Stadium.
April 29 – Jerry Koosman steps on the mound at Shea Stadium for the first time in his career against the New York Mets. The Mets beat Koosman and the Philadelphia Phillies, 6–2.

May
May 2 - The Cleveland Indians' Andre Thornton ties an American League record for walks in a game with six.
May 4 – Dave Kingman of the Oakland Athletics pops a ball up that never comes down.  Playing the Minnesota Twins at the Metrodome, Kingman's pop fly goes through the roof of the stadium.
May 8 – Hall of Famer Kirby Puckett makes his major league debut, going 4 for 5 as his Minnesota Twins shut out California, Puckett will collect 2300 more hits before retiring prematurely in 1996 due to vision problems in his left eye.
May 8 – May 9 – The Chicago White Sox and Milwaukee Brewers face off in a game that started on the 8th, the game is suspended after a 3–3 tie and seventeen innings. When the game is resumed the next day, both teams manage to score three runs in the 21st inning, and is only ended when Harold Baines slams a home run in the bottom of the 25th inning to end the 8 hour, six minute marathon;  the longest game, by time, in Major League history.  Tom Seaver, the last pitcher available for the White Sox, earns the win, and then goes on to start the regularly scheduled game that day, earning a second win on one day for a starting pitcher.
May 9 – After Mets pitching allows 31 runs in the previous three games, Ron Darling, Doug Sisk and Jesse Orosco combine to hold the Atlanta Braves to just one run at Shea Stadium.
May 11 – Dwight Gooden out duels Fernando Valenzuela as the New York Mets defeat the Los Angeles Dodgers 2–0 at Dodger Stadium. Valenzuela strikes out eight in eight innings, while Gooden strikes out eleven in a complete game.
May 12 – In defeating the St. Louis Cardinals 2–1 at Riverfront Stadium, Mario Soto of the Cincinnati Reds has a no-hitter broken up with two out in the ninth as George Hendrick's solo home run ties the game at 1–1. It is the only hit Soto allows. The Reds win the game for Soto in the bottom of the ninth, as Brad Gulden singles in Dave Concepción, the winning run.
May 16 - Mike Schmidt hit his 400th home run and Len Matuszek drove in four runs to lead The Philadelphia Phillies to a 12–1 win over The Los Angeles Dodgers. Schmidt became the 20th player to hit 400 home runs as Jerry Koosman the winning pitcher beat the Dodgers for the first time Since 1975 when Koosman was pitching for the New York Mets.
May 24 – The Detroit Tigers' Jack Morris pitches a four hit complete game victory against the California Angels to improve his record to 9–1, and the team's record to 35–5, the best 40-game start in major league history.
May 27 – As the Cincinnati Reds played the Chicago Cubs at Wrigley Field, Cubs third baseman Ron Cey hit a long foul ball down the left field line, but third base umpire Steve Rippley incorrectly ruled it a home run. Reds pitcher Mario Soto shoves Rippley during an argument over the call. After conferring, the umpires change their decision and rule it a foul ball. However, for shoving Rippley, Soto is ejected, prompting him to charge the field and attack Cubs third base coach Don Zimmer, which triggers a ten-minute bench-clearing brawl. The Reds win the game, completing a three-game sweep of the Cubs. Four days later, National League president Chub Feeney suspends Soto five games for the incident.

June
June 9 – A 12–2 victory over the Cincinnati Reds coupled with an Atlanta Braves loss give the San Diego Padres their first division lead in the National League West since May 28. The Padres do not relinquish their division lead for the remainder of the season.
June 13 – Rick Sutcliffe, George Frazier and Ron Hassey are traded by the Cleveland Indians to the Chicago Cubs, in exchange for Joe Carter, Mel Hall, Don Schulze and Darryl Banks.  Sutcliffe becomes the ace of the Cubs' staff, making 20 starts and winning 16 of 17 decisions with a 2.69 ERA.
June 16 – Leading off the fifth inning, Cincinnati Reds pitcher Mario Soto throws several brushback pitches at Atlanta Braves slugger Claudell Washington, who had homered in his last at-bat. Washington tosses his bat in the direction of Soto, and tries to go out to retrieve it, but instead walks toward the mound. The chief umpire and Reds infielder Lenny Harris attempts to restrain Washington, but he is thrown to the ground. Soto uses the distraction to punch Washington. Several of Washington's teammates attempt to hold Washington to the ground. While they are doing that, Soto fires the baseball into the crowd of players, striking Braves coach Joe Pignatano. Soto is suspended three games for this incident while Washington receives a five-game suspension for shoving Harris.
June 19 – In his first start since being acquired from the Cleveland Indians, Rick Sutcliffe pitches into the ninth inning against the Pittsburgh Pirates at Three Rivers Stadium without allowing a run. Sutcliffe is lifted in the ninth after giving up one earned run and is charged with two more unearned runs after Lee Smith replaces him on the mound. Even though, the Cubs hold on for the 4–3 victory.
June 23 – At Wrigley Field, the Chicago Cubs and rival St. Louis Cardinals locked up in what would be a tight game. In the bottom of the ninth inning, trailing 9–8, Cubs second baseman Ryne Sandberg hit a solo-home run off reliever Bruce Sutter. The Cardinals regained the lead in the tenth inning, 11–9, but Sandberg hit another home run against Sutter in the bottom of the frame, this time with one runner on base and two outs. In a lost cause, St. Louis outfielder Willie McGee would hit for the cycle, as the Cubs went on to win the game 12–11 in the following inning and eventually won the National League East title. Sandberg earned the MVP Award this season, with this game as a key contribution.

July
July 4 – Phil Niekro of the New York Yankees records his 3,000th career strikeout. He is the second to do so on the Fourth of July, after Nolan Ryan in 1980.
July 10 – At Candlestick Park, on the 50th anniversary of Carl Hubbell's legendary five consecutive strikeouts in the  All-Star Game, National League pitchers Fernando Valenzuela and Dwight Gooden combine to fan six batters in a row for a new All-Star Game record in the NL's 3–1 triumph over the American League. After Valenzuela whiffs Dave Winfield, Reggie Jackson and George Brett in the 4th inning, Gooden, the youngest All-Star ever at age 19, fans Lance Parrish, Chet Lemon and Alvin Davis in the 5th inning. Gary Carter is named the Game MVP.
July 21 – The New York Yankees retire Roger Maris' number 9 and Elston Howard's number 32.
July 26 – Pete Rose of the Montreal Expos tied Ty Cobb on the career singles list, No. 3,052, with a base hit in the eighth inning in a 5–4 victory over the Pittsburgh Pirates.

August
August 1 – A 5–4 victory over the Philadelphia Phillies and a Mets loss to the St. Louis Cardinals pull the Chicago Cubs into first place in the National League East for the first time since July 6. They remain atop their division for the remainder of the season.
August 2 - Rick Cerone's bloop single drove in the tie-breaking run in the eighth inning as the New York Yankees beat the Milwaukee Brewers 6-4 and reached the .500 mark for the first time since April 20.
August 3 - Nolan Ryan scattered seven hits and Jerry Mumphrey homered and singled and drove in four runs as the Houston Astros beat the San Diego Padres, 6-2. Ryan is now 9-7 for the season.
August 9 – Tom Seaver only lasts 3.2 innings and gives up six earned runs in his first career start against the New York Yankees. Seaver is credited with the loss, as the Yankees beat the Chicago White Sox 7–6.
August 12 – Atlanta-Fulton County Stadium sees a series of beanings, attempted beanings, and two bench clearing fist fights, the second of which sees fans spill out onto the field. Nineteen Atlanta Braves and San Diego Padres are ejected. Dick Williams, manager of the Padres, is fined $10,000 and suspended ten days, while Braves manager Joe Torre is suspended for three games.
August 16 – It is announced that the Cincinnati Reds trade Tom Lawless to the Montréal Expos. Pete Rose returns to the Reds; he is also named player-manager.
August 24 - Rick Sutcliffe allowed just five hits in winning his 10th consecutive game and Ryan Sandberg drove in two runs as the National League East leading Chicago Cubs beat the Atlanta Braves, 3-0.
August 29 – Keith Hernandez hits a walk-off double to complete the New York Mets' three-game sweep of the Los Angeles Dodgers.

September
September 7 – In a crucial battle for first place in the National League East, Dwight Gooden strikes out eleven Chicago Cubs batters and allows only one hit (a lead-off single by Keith Moreland in the fifth inning) in the Mets' 10–0 victory at Shea.
September 14 – Seattle Mariners rookie Mark Langston pitches a 2–1, five-hit victory against the Kansas City Royals, to becomes the first pitcher in Mariners history to win 15 games in a regular season.

September 15 – San Diego Padres outfielder Tony Gwynn collects his 200th hit of the season in a 3–2 loss to the Houston Astros.
September 17 :
Reggie Jackson becomes the 13th player in Major League Baseball history to record 500 home runs. Jackson achieved his feat against Kansas City Royals pitcher Bud Black, as his 500th homer comes exactly 17 years after he gets his first career hit.
Rookie pitcher Dwight Gooden of the New York Mets strikes out 16 Philadelphia Phillies in a 2–1 loss at Philadelphia. After fanning 16 Pittsburgh Pirates five days earlier, Gooden ties a major league record with 32 strikeouts in two consecutive games.
September 18 – The Detroit Tigers clinch the American League Eastern Division, becoming the fourth team in history to hold first place from day one of the season (joining the  New York Giants, the  New York Yankees, and  Brooklyn Dodgers).
September 19 – Pete Rose collects his 100th hit of the season, becoming the first player in Major League history to collect that many hits in 22 consecutive seasons.  It happens to be his 725th career double, which establishes a new National League record.
September 20 – Tim Lollar's three-run home run caps a 5–4 come-from-behind win for the San Diego Padres over the San Francisco Giants, clinching the very first division title for the Padres.
September 23 – A 4–1 win over the New York Yankees gives the Detroit Tigers 100 wins for the season, and gives Tigers' manager Sparky Anderson the honor of being the first manager in history to guide teams to 100-win seasons in both leagues.
September 24 – On the fifteenth anniversary of the Chicago Cubs being eliminated from the  pennant chase, the Cubs' Rick Sutcliffe pitches a 4–1 two-hit complete game over the Pittsburgh Pirates in Three Rivers Stadium to clinch the National League Eastern Division title for the Cubs; the first post-season appearance for the team since 1945.
September 25 – At Shea Stadium, 40-year-old Rusty Staub of the New York Mets hits a walk-off home run off Larry Andersen to defeat the Philadelphia Phillies 6–4.
September 28 – In addition to saving 29 games this season, Minnesota Twins closer Ron Davis blows his 14th save today to tie a season record.  The mark was set in 1976 by future Hall-of-Famer Rollie Fingers, and subsequently tied by Bruce Sutter (1978) and Bob Stanley (1983).
September 30 – Mike Witt of the California Angels holds on for a 1–0 win over the Texas Rangers, the 11th perfect game since .
September 30 – In the New York Yankees' final game of the season, the American League batting race is decided when Don Mattingly goes 4 for 5 to raise his average to .343, while teammate Dave Winfield finishes with a .340 average. The two teammates battle for the league lead in batting average for most of the year.

October
October 3 – Johnny Grubb delivers a two-run double in the eleventh inning to lift the Detroit Tigers to a 5–3 victory over the Kansas City Royals in game two of the 1984 American League Championship Series.
October 5 – The Detroit Tigers' Milt Wilcox and the Kansas City Royals' Charlie Leibrandt engage in a pitchers' duel in the third game of the American League Championship Series. A Marty Castillo ground out in the second inning that scores Chet Lemon is the deciding factor, as the Tigers win 1–0 to sweep the ALCS, 3–0.
October 6 – Steve Garvey hits a walk off, two-run home run off Lee Smith in game four of the 1984 National League Championship Series to even it at two games apiece. For the evening, Garvey has five RBIs in the San Diego Padres' 7–5 victory over the Chicago Cubs.
October 7 – A crucial error by Chicago Cubs first baseman Leon Durham leads to a four-run seventh inning for the San Diego Padres, who beat the Cubs, 6–3, in the final game of the 1984 National League Championship Series. Steve Garvey, who bats .400 with a home run and seven RBIs is named series MVP.
October 14 – Kirk Gibson blasts two upper-deck home runs at Tiger Stadium in Game Five of the 1984 World Series, to lead the Detroit Tigers to an 8–4 victory over the San Diego Padres and its first World Championship since 1968. Alan Trammell is selected the Series MVP.
October 17 - Jim Frey of the Chicago Cubs who led his team to its first National League East title was named the National League manager of the year by the BBWAA.

November
November 6 – Willie Hernández wins the American League MVP Award, joining Rollie Fingers as the only relief pitchers in Major League Baseball history to be named MVP and Cy Young Award winners in the same season. Boston Red Sox slugger Tony Armas finishes seventh, despite winning the home run (43) and RBI (123) titles. The last player to lead in those categories and not win is Ted Williams, twice, in the 1942 and 1947 seasons.
November 13 - Ryne Sandberg, whose efforts afield and at bat helped the Chicago Cubs win their first championship in 39 years was named the National League Most Valuable Player.
November 20 – Four days after his 20th birthday, New York Mets pitcher Dwight Gooden becomes the youngest player ever to win the National League Rookie of the Year Award. Gooden posts a 17–9 record with a 2.60 ERA and a major league-leading 276 strikeouts.
November 22 – Seattle Mariners first baseman Alvin Davis easily wins the American League Rookie of the Year Award over teammate pitcher Mark Langston and Minnesota Twins outfielder Kirby Puckett.
November 27 – The American League Gold Glove team is announced, and is made up of the same nine players as the  team: Ron Guidry (P), Lance Parrish (C), Eddie Murray (1B), Lou Whitaker (2B), Buddy Bell (3B), Alan Trammell (SS), Dwight Evans (OF), Dave Winfield (OF) and Dwayne Murphy (OF).

December
December 12 – The Montreal Expos trade future Hall of Fame catcher Gary Carter to the New York Mets for shortstop Hubie Brooks, catcher Mike Fitzgerald, outfielder Herm Winningham and pitching prospect Floyd Youmans.

Movies
The Natural

Births

January
January 3 – Neil Wagner
January 4 – John Raynor
January 6 – Jimmy Barthmaier
January 7 – Carlos Corporán
January 7 – Jon Lester
January 8 – Jeff Francoeur
January 8 – Kevin Whelan
January 9 – Dustin Richardson
January 10 – Hunter Jones
January 12 – Scott Olsen
January 14 – Erick Aybar
January 14 – Mike Pelfrey
January 16 – Matt Maloney
January 18 – Justin Thomas
January 21 – Robert Ray
January 22 – Ubaldo Jiménez
January 24 – Scott Kazmir
January 25 – Tyler Graham
January 30 – Jeremy Hermida
January 31 – Josh Johnson

February
February 2 – Chin-Lung Hu
February 4 – Doug Fister
February 9 – Dioner Navarro
February 10 – Luis Cruz
February 10 – Alex Gordon
February 11 – J. R. Towles
February 13 – Matt Buschmann
February 13 – Brett Hayes
February 15 – Mitchell Boggs
February 15 – Nate Schierholtz
February 18 – Brian Bogusevic
February 20 – Brian McCann
February 27 – Jumbo Díaz
February 27 – Scott Mathieson
February 27 – Aníbal Sánchez
February 27 – Denard Span

March
March 2 – Will Little
March 8 – Yoshihisa Hirano
March 9 – Elliot Johnson
March 9 – Craig Stammen
March 10 – Aaron Bates
March 11 – Frank Mata
March 12 – José Arredondo
March 12 – Frankie de la Cruz
March 14 – Randor Bierd
March 16 – Harvey García
March 19 – Matt Downs
March 21 – Warner Madrigal
March 22 – Joe Smith
March 23 – Jon Link
March 29 – Kila Ka'aihue

April
April 3 – Kyle Phillips
April 8 – Diory Hernández
April 9 – Adam Loewen
April 11 – Andrés Blanco
April 11 – Alejandro De Aza
April 14 – Christopher Leroux
April 17 – Jed Lowrie
April 18 – Marcos Mateo
April 19 – Ambiorix Burgos
April 19 – Jesús Delgado
April 21 – Zach Kroenke
April 23 – Dave Davidson
April 25 – Robert Andino
April 26 – Shawn Kelley
April 26 – Brian Omogrosso
April 27 – Luis Perdomo
April 28 – Pedro López
April 28 – Rómulo Sánchez
April 29 – Cesar Carrillo
April 29 – Billy Petrick

May
May 4 – Sam LeCure
May 4 – Kevin Slowey
May 5 – Luis Valdez
May 7 – James Loney
May 8 – Adam Moore
May 9 – Prince Fielder
May 9 – Chase Headley
May 10 – Kam Mickolio
May 10 – Edward Mujica
May 12 – Chris Robinson
May 14 – Luke Gregerson
May 15 – Everett Teaford
May 16 – Jensen Lewis
May 16 – Brandon Mann
May 16 – Rafael Martin
May 18 – David Patton
May 18 – Joakim Soria
May 24 – Héctor Ambriz
May 25 – Graham Taylor
May 27 – Miguel González
May 30 – Frank Herrmann
May 31 – Andrew Bailey

June
June 1 – Wilkin Castillo
June 5 – Robinson Chirinos
June 6 – Emiliano Fruto
June 7 – Justin Berg
June 9 – Yuli Gurriel
June 10 – Travis Chick
June 12 – Roger Bernadina
June 12 – Kyle McClellan
June 14 – Jesús Guzmán
June 15 – Tim Lincecum
June 15 – Cliff Pennington
June 16 – Jonathan Broxton
June 18 – Fernando Rodriguez
June 20 – Cole Gillespie
June 21 – Gabe Morales
June 22 – Cesar Ramos
June 26 – Elijah Dukes
June 26 – Luis Hernández
June 28 – Clay Zavada
June 29 – Hernán Iribarren

July
July 1 – Rich Thompson
July 2 – Wladimir Balentien
July 7 – Alfredo Fígaro
July 8 – Kevin Russo
July 11 – Yorman Bazardo
July 11 – Jon Meloan
July 15 – Anthony Claggett
July 15 – Brandon Gomes
July 18 – Allen Craig
July 18 - Michael Collins
July 20 – Alexi Casilla
July 20 – Danny Dorn
July 26 – Kevin Jepsen
July 26 – Brandon Morrow
July 27 – Max Scherzer
July 27 – Tsuyoshi Nishioka
July 29 – Chad Billingsley
July 29 – Mark Hamilton
July 31 – Fernando Hernández

August
August 1 – Brandon Kintzler
August 2 – Luke Hughes
August 2 – Konrad Schmidt
August 3 – Germán Durán
August 3 – Sergio Escalona
August 3 – Matt Joyce
August 5 – Sean Kazmar
August 6 – Osiris Matos
August 7 – Wade LeBlanc
August 9 – Graham Godfrey
August 10 – Jeff Marquez
August 11 – Melky Cabrera
August 13 – Boone Logan
August 14 – Nevin Ashley
August 14 – Clay Buchholz
August 15 – Tyson Brummett
August 15 – Jarrod Dyson
August 15 – Chris Pettit
August 19 – Marcos Carvajal
August 20 – Jamie Hoffmann
August 21 – Dustin Molleken
August 21 – Melvin Upton Jr.
August 22 – David Huff
August 26 – Kyle Kendrick
August 28 – Will Harris
August 30 – Steven Wright

September
September 2 – Dusty Ryan
September 4 – Jason Donald
September 7 – Mauro Gómez
September 8 – Rob Delaney
September 8 – Bobby Parnell
September 9 – Brett Pill
September 10 – Andrew Brown
September 13 – Jesse English
September 14 – Robert Mosebach
September 14 – Josh Outman
September 18 – Donald Veal
September 19 – Danny Valencia
September 21 – Joaquin Arias
September 21 – Carlos Rosa
September 23 – Matt Kemp
September 24 – Scott Carroll
September 24 – Rafael Rodríguez
September 25 – Michael Crotta
September 25 – Víctor Gárate
September 27 – John Lannan
September 28 – Thad Weber
September 28 – Ryan Zimmerman

October
October 1 – Matt Cain
October 1 – Chris Johnson
October 3 – Lance Barrett
October 2 – Oswaldo Navarro
October 2 – Matt Reynolds
October 4 – Drew Stubbs
October 10 – Troy Tulowitzki
October 11 – Max Ramírez
October 13 – Steven Lerud
October 13 – Hayden Penn
October 14 – Kris Johnson
October 19 – James McDonald
October 19 – Travis Schlichting
October 19 – Josh Tomlin
October 21 – Danny Herrera
October 21 – José Lobatón
October 22 – Takuya Asao
October 24 – Lucas May
October 26 – Jesús Flores
October 29 – José Mijares
October 30 – Shane Robinson
October 31 – Anthony Varvaro

November
November 1 – Stephen Vogt
November 2 – Tommy Layne
November 3 – Brandon Dickson
November 3 – Jonathan Herrera
November 6 – Ricky Romero
November 6 – Atahualpa Severino
November 9 – Joel Zumaya
November 10 – Kazuhisa Makita
November 12 – César Jiménez
November 13 – Tony Abreu
November 20 – Jo-Jo Reyes
November 21 – Quintin Berry
November 22 – Yusmeiro Petit
November 23 – Robert Coello
November 23 – Justin Turner
November 23 – Casper Wells
November 24 – Joel Guzmán

December
December 3 – Tobi Stoner
December 4 - Takayuki Kishi
December 5 – Josh Lueke
December 7 – Mike Baxter
December 10 – Gregorio Petit
December 11 – Josh Butler
December 14 – Chris Heisey
December 15 – Cole Garner
December 15 – James Houser
December 17 – Stuart Pomeranz
December 18 – Josh Rodriguez
December 19 – Ian Kennedy
December 20 – Brian Abraham
December 21 – Eddie Gamboa
December 23 – Josh Satin
December 26 – Darin Downs
December 26 – Brett Sinkbeil
December 28 – Barret Browning

Deaths

January
January 1 – Hazel Measner, 58, Canadian pitcher who played in the All-American Girls Professional Baseball League in its 1946 season.
January 6 – Billy Lee, 89, who appeared in 25 games, chiefly as an outfielder, for the 1914–1915 St. Louis Browns.
January 18 – Leo Kiely, 54, pitcher for the Boston Red Sox in the 1950s, who in 1957 set two PCL records with 20 wins in relief, 14 of them in consecutive games, and also became the first major leaguer to play in Japanese Baseball, for the Mainichi Orions, in 1953.
January 22 – Johnny Spencer, 86, outfielder who played in 1921 and 1922 for the Pittsburgh Keystones of the Negro National League and the barnstorming Homestead Grays.
January 28 – Ray Harrell, 71, pitcher who worked in 119 total games over six seasons spanning 1935 to 1945 for five National League clubs, principally the St. Louis Cardinals and Philadelphia Phillies.
January – Frank Russell, 62, second baseman, third baseman and outfielder for the Baltimore Elite Giants of the Negro National League (1943–1944, 1946, 1948).

February
February 10 – Johanna Hageman, 65, one of the sixty original members of the All-American Girls Professional Baseball League in 1943.
February 14 – Loren Babe, 56, third baseman who played in 120 games for the New York Yankees (1952–1953) and Philadelphia Athletics (1953); later a minor league manager and MLB coach for the Yankees (1967) and Chicago White Sox (1979–1980 and 1983).
February 19 – Bill Shores, 79, pitcher who worked in 96 career games for the 1928–1931 Philadelphia Athletics, 1933 New York Giants and 1937 Chicago White Sox; member of three World Series champion clubs (1929, 1930, 1933).
February 20 – Dale Matthewson, 60, pitcher who made 28 total appearances for wartime 1943–1944 Philadelphia Phillies.
February 26 – Joe Kuhel, 77, first baseman who played in 2,104 games for the Washington Senators and Chicago White Sox between 1930 and 1947; known for strong defense, batted .300 three times; manager of Senators in 1948 and 1949.

March
March 8 – Bruce Cunningham, 78, pitcher who appeared in 104 games for 1929–1932 Boston Braves.
March 9 – Ping Gardner, 69, pitcher in Negro leagues between 1923 and 1932; led Eastern Colored League in games lost (ten) in 1928.
March 10 – Bill McGhee, 75, first baseman and left fielder who played 170 games for wartime 1944–1945 Philadelphia Athletics.
March 14 – "Gentleman John" Enzmann, 94, pitcher for 1914 Brooklyn Robins and 1918–1920 Cleveland Indians, who made 67 MLB appearances; member of 1920 World Series champions.
March 15 – Buckshot May, 84, pitcher whose 13 years in the minor leagues were punctuated by one game and one inning pitched for the Pittsburgh Pirates on May 9, 1924.
March 18 – Charley Lau, 50, backup catcher and pinch-hitter for four MLB clubs between 1956 and 1967 who became a renowned hitting instructor, with the Chicago White Sox since 1982; earned fame as the Kansas City Royals' batting coach (1971–1978) where his star pupil was George Brett.
March 20 – Stan Coveleski, 94, Hall of Fame pitcher who had five 20-win seasons with the Indians and Senators, and led Cleveland to the 1920 World Series championship with three victories over the Brooklyn Dodgers; spitballer led AL in ERA twice and strikeouts once.
March 26 – Norman "Bobby" Robinson, 70, centerfielder for the Baltimore Elite Giants and Birmingham Black Barons of the Negro leagues; due to an injury, lost his centerfield job to 17-year-old Willie Mays in 1948.
March 27 – Oliverio "Baby" Ortíz, 64, Cuban pitcher who made two appearances as a starting hurler for the wartime 1944 Washington Senators.
March 28 – Jess Pike, 68, outfielder who played 14 years in the minor leagues, but in only 16 games for 1946 New York Giants as a 30-year-old rookie.
March 29 – Hugh Poland, 74, catcher in 83 games for four NL teams between 1943 and 1948; longtime scout for Giants in New York and San Francisco.

April
April 2 – Ike Davis, 88, shortstop for the 1919 Washington Senators and 1924–1925 Chicago White Sox, appearing in 164 career games.
April 5 – Chet Kehn, 62, pitcher for the 1942 Brooklyn Dodgers, and one of many players who only appeared in the majors during World War II.
April 6 – Glenn Wright, 83, shortstop for the Pittsburgh Pirates, Brooklyn Robins and Dodgers, and Chicago White Sox between 1924 and 1935; batted .294 lifetime with 94 home runs in 1,119 games; member of 1925 World Series champion Pirates; later, a minor-league manager and longtime scout.
April 10 – Karl Spooner, 52, Brooklyn Dodgers southpaw who struck out 15 and 12 hitters and allowed only seven total hits in his first two MLB appearances—both complete game shutouts—in 1954, but whose pitching career was ultimately ruined by a shoulder injury sustained the following spring; appeared in 31 total National League games (1954–1955) and two World Series contests (1955).
April 11 – Leo Dixon, 89, catcher for 1925 to 1927 St. Louis Browns and 1929 Cincinnati Reds, appearing in 159 career games.
April 17 – Sanford Jackson, 84, centerfielder/shortstop/third baseman in the Negro leagues between 1924 and 1932, chiefly for the Chicago American Giants and Memphis Red Sox; two-time Negro World Series champion.
April 26 – Alonza Bailey, 80, pitcher for the Newark Dodgers of the Negro National League in 1933 and 1934.
April 29 – Howie Gorman, 70, outfielder who played in 14 games for the Philadelphia Phillies during 1937 and 1938.

May
May 11 – Earl Reid, 70, pitcher who appeared in two games (winning his only decision) for the Boston Braves in May 1946.
May 13 – Walter French, 84, reserve outfielder who hit .303 lifetime in 397 career games for the Philadelphia Athletics (1923 and 1925–1929); member of 1929 World Series champions.
May 13 – Russ Young, 81, switch-hitting catcher who got into 16 games for the 1931 St. Louis Browns.
May 14 – Elmer Riddle, 69, standout pitcher for early 1940s Cincinnati Reds, posting a 19–4 mark in 1941 and leading NL in earned run average (2.24), then, two years later, leading his circuit in wins (21); member of 1940 World Series champions; brother of Johnny Riddle.
May 15 – Nick Goulish, 67, outfielder and pinch hitter who got into 14 games for wartime 1944–1945 Philadelphia Phillies.
May 16 – Andrew "Pat" Patterson, 72, six-time All-Star second baseman in the Negro leagues who played between 1934 and 1947; member, 1946 Negro World Series champion Newark Eagles.
May – Leroy Sutton, 63, pitcher for six years (1940 to 1945) in the Negro American League for the St. Louis–New Orleans Stars, Chicago American Giants and Cincinnati–Indianapolis Clowns.

June
June 7 – Rabbit Benton, 82, second baseman who played five games for the 1922 Philadelphia Phillies.
June 9 – Bobby Rhawn, 65, infielder who played in 90 games for the New York Giants, Pittsburgh Pirates and Chicago White Sox from 1947 to 1949.
June 17 – Jim Hegan, 63, five-time All-Star catcher for the Cleveland Indians (and member of 1948 World Series champions) and four other teams between 1941 and 1960, known for outstanding defense; later a longtime New York Yankees coach; son Mike had a long career as first baseman and broadcaster.
June 24 – Jim Roberts, 88, pitcher who appeared in a dozen games for 1924–1925 Brooklyn Robins.

July
July 4 – Doyt Morris, 67, outfielder who appeared in six games with the Philadelphia Athletics in 1937.
July 8 – Ralph Coles, 71, outfielder for the Cleveland Bears and Jacksonville Red Caps of the Negro American League from 1939 to 1941.
July 9 – Charlie Uhlir, 71, outfielder for Chicago White Sox in 1934.
July 11 – Moose Clabaugh, 82, outfielder who had an 11-game trial with 1926 Brooklyn Robins, the same season he slugged 62 home runs to lead the Class D East Texas League in round-trippers.
July 11 – Lyle Luttrell, 54, shortstop who appeared in 57 games for the 1956–1957 Washington Senators.
July 14 – Al Schacht, 91, pitcher (1919–1921) and coach (1924–1934) for Washington Senators famous for his on-field comedy routines with fellow coach Nick Altrock; also coached for Boston Red Sox (1935–1936); known as "The Clown Prince of Baseball," he continued to entertain fans at major and minor league parks thereafter.
July 16 – Bernell Longest, 66, second baseman for the Chicago American Giants and Cleveland Buckeyes of the Negro American League between 1946 and 1948.
July 16 – Ed Short, 64, Chicago White Sox front office executive from 1950 through 1970, and general manager from August 26, 1961 to September 2, 1970.
July 22 – Johnny Washington, 68, three-time All-Star first baseman and 1940 Negro National League batting champion who played for the Pittsburgh Crawfords, New York Black Yankees and Baltimore Elite Giants between 1936 and 1948.
July 24 – Jake Dunn, 74, played every position but catcher (though primarily a shortstop and right fielder) during his Negro leagues career from 1930 to 1943.
July 31 – Beans Reardon, 86, National League umpire from 1926 to 1949 who worked in five World Series; known for his colorful arguments and continued use of the outside ("balloon") chest protector within the NL.

August
August 3 – Elmer Smith, 91, outfielder in 1,012 games for five clubs, principally the Cleveland Naps and Indians, for ten seasons spanning 1914 to 1925; member of 1920 World Series champions. 
August 6 – Johnnie Dawson, 69, catcher who played for four Negro American League teams, notably the Kansas City Monarchs, between 1938 and 1942.
August 8 – Bert Hamric, 56, outfielder by trade who appeared in ten MLB games as a pinch hitter for the 1955 Brooklyn Dodgers and 1958 Baltimore Orioles.
August 14 – Spud Davis, 79, good-hitting catcher (.308 career average and 1,312 hits) who played in 1,458 games over 16 seasons (1928–1941 and 1944–1945) for four National League clubs; member of world-champion 1934 St. Louis Cardinals; later, a coach who managed 1946 Pittsburgh Pirates for three end-of-season games. 
August 14 – Lynn McGlothen, 34, pitcher for six MLB clubs between 1972 and 1982 who had his best years with the St. Louis Cardinals and Chicago Cubs; 1974 National League All-Star.
August 15 – Tom Gee, 84, catcher for the 1925–1926 New York Lincoln Giants and 1926 Newark Eagles of the Eastern Colored League.
August 16 – Tommie Aaron, 45, first baseman and left fielder who played for the Braves in Milwaukee and Atlanta, and Braves coach since 1978; younger brother of Hank Aaron.
August 22 – Roy Tyler, 84, outfielder who played for three Negro National League clubs between 1925 and 1933.
August 23 – Charlie Robertson, 88, pitcher who spent most of his career with the Chicago White Sox; pitched a perfect game in 1923 against the Tigers in his fourth major league start; last survivor of the 1919 White Sox team.
August 25 – Waite Hoyt, 84, Hall of Fame pitcher whose 237 victories included 20-win seasons for the Yankees in 1927–1928; won six World Series games, giving up only two unearned runs in three complete games in the 1921 Series; Cincinnati Reds' play-by-play broadcaster from 1942 to 1965.
August 24 – Roy Easterwood, 69, catcher and pinch hitter who played in 17 games for the wartime 1944 Chicago Cubs.
August 25 – Skeeter Scalzi, 71, infielder and pinch runner who appeared in 11 games for 1939 New York Giants; longtime minor-league manager.
August 26 – Bill Trotter, 74, pitcher who worked in 163 games for the St. Louis Browns (1937–1942), Washington Senators (1942) and St. Louis Cardinals (1944).
August 31 – Audrey Wagner, 56, All-Star outfielder in the AAGPBL who won three home run titles, a batting crown, and the 1948 Player of the Year Award.

September
September 7 – Joe Cronin, 77, Hall of Fame shortstop and manager, and AL president from 1959 to 1973, who batted .301 lifetime and had eight 100-RBI seasons; managed Washington Senators to 1933 pennant at age 26, won 1946 flag with Boston Red Sox, and was general manager of the Red Sox from 1948 to January 1959.
September 10 – Johnny Marcum, 75, good-hitting pitcher (141 hits, .265 lifetime) who appeared in 299 American League games (including 195 mound appearances and 113 pinch-hitting assignments) for Philadelphia (1933–1935), Boston (1936–1938), St. Louis (1939) and Chicago (1939).
September 11 – Paul Carter, 90, right-hander who pitched in 127 games for the 1914–1915 Cleveland Naps/Indians and 1916–1920 Chicago Cubs.
September 14 – Edgar Barnhart, 79, St. Louis Browns pitcher who hurled one scoreless inning in his only MLB game, on September 23, 1924.
September 14 – Jimmy Pofahl, 67, shortstop-second baseman for Washington who got into 225 career games between 1940 and 1942.
September 26 – Walt Bashore, 74, outfielder and pinch hitter in ten games for the 1936 Philadelphia Phillies.

October
October 1 – Walter Alston, 72, Hall of Fame manager who guided Dodgers teams in Brooklyn and Los Angeles to seven National League pennants and four World Series championships between 1954 and 1976; his 2,040 wins ranked behind only John McGraw in NL history upon retirement.
October 1 – Billy Goodman, 58, All-Star infielder, principally for the Boston Red Sox and Chicago White Sox, who won the 1950 AL batting title; later a coach for the Atlanta Braves.
October 4 – Joe Marty, 71, center fielder who played 538 games for the 1937–1939 Chicago Cubs and 1939–1941 Philadelphia Phillies.
October 7 –  Art Butler, 96, shortstop/second baseman who appeared in 454 games for Boston, Pittsburgh and St. Louis of the National League from 1911 to 1916.
October 13 – Dixie Carroll, 93, speedy outfielder who played in 15 games for the 1919 Boston Braves.
October 13 – Ed Carroll, 77, pitcher for the 1929 Boston Red Sox.
October 13 – George Kelly, 89, Hall of Fame first baseman, nicknamed "High Pockets", who batted over .300 six straight years with the New York Giants from 1921 to 1926; led NL in RBI (1920, 1924) and home runs (1921); later a coach and scout.
October 15 – Red Cox, 89, pitched three games for the 1920 Detroit Tigers.
October 19 – Del Lundgren, 85, pitched from 1924 through 1927 for the Pittsburgh Pirates and Boston Red Sox.
October 21 – Johnny Rigney, 69, one of the Chicago White Sox' top pitchers in the years prior to World War II, who later became the club's farm system director and, from 1956 to 1958, co-general manager; husband of Dorothy Comiskey.
October 22 – Babe Pinelli, 89, National League umpire from 1935 to 1956, previously a Reds third baseman; he worked in six World Series, last calling balls and strikes on Don Larsen's perfect game in 1956.
October 25 – Joe Wiggins, 78, infielder who played in the Negro leagues between 1930 and 1934.
October 26 – Gus Mancuso, 78, catcher who appeared in 1,460 games for five National League clubs between 1928 and 1945; played on five pennant winners and two World Series champions with the St. Louis Cardinals and New York Giants; two-time NL All-Star.
October 27 – Hank Helf, 71, backup catcher who played for Cleveland Indians (seven total games in 1938 and 1940) and St. Louis Browns (71 games in 1946) who, in a 1938 publicity stunt, caught baseballs dropped from the top of the  Cleveland Terminal Tower.

November
November 7 – George Bennette, 83, outfielder for multiple clubs in the Negro National League between 1921 and 1932.
November 17 – Dewey Creacy, 84, third- and second baseman who played 15 seasons (1924–1938) in the Negro leagues, mainly for the St. Louis Stars and Philadelphia Stars.
November 20 – Leon Williams, 78, pitcher, outfielder and pinch hitter who got into a dozen contests for the 1926 Brooklyn Robins.
November 25 – Ival Goodman, 76, All-Star right fielder for the 1935–1944 Cincinnati Reds who led NL in triples twice.
November 28 – Maurice Young, 79, pitcher for the 1927 Kansas City Monarchs of the Negro National League in 1927.
November 30 – Chris Pelekoudas, 66, NL umpire from 1960 to 1975 who worked in two World Series and two NLCS.

December
December 1 – Ted Page, 81, outfielder for the Newark Eagles of the Eastern Colored League and Pittsburgh Crawfords of the Negro National League between 1926 and 1937; named an All-Star in 1933.
December 7 – Howie Reed, 47, pitcher for five teams from 1958 to 1971, including the 1965 World Series champion Los Angeles Dodgers.
December 16 – Debs Garms, 77, outfielder and third baseman who won the 1940 NL batting title with the Pittsburgh Pirates.
December 19 – Bill Warwick, 87, catcher who appeared sparingly (23 career appearances) for 1921 Pirates and 1925–1926 St. Louis Cardinals; member of 1926 World Series champions.
December 20 – Walt "Cuckoo" Christensen, 85, longtime minor-league outfielder who hit .315 lifetime in 171 MLB games as a member of the 1926–1927 Cincinnati Reds.
December 20 – Gonzalo Márquez, 38, Venezuelan first baseman who batted .625 in the 1972 postseason as an Oakland Athletics rookie.
December 20 – Art McLarney, 76, shortstop who appeared in nine games for the 1932 New York Giants.
December 20 – Steve Slayton, 82, pitcher who played for the 1928 Boston Red Sox.
December 26 – Johnny Gill, 79, outfielder who played 118 career MLB games over six seasons between 1927 and 1936, most notably for the Chicago Cubs.
December 27 – Shirley Petway, 76, 1932 catcher/outfielder who played in the Negro leagues between 1932 and 1944.

References